The 2010 Tajik League was the 19th season of Tajik League, the Tajikistan Football Federation's top division of association football. Vakhsh Qurghonteppa were the defending champions, having won the previous season, but would lose their title to Istiklol.

Teams

League standings

References

External links
 RSSSF 2010

Tajikistan Higher League seasons
1
Tajik
Tajik